The Porsche 917 is a sports prototype race car developed by German manufacturer Porsche to exploit the regulations regarding the construction of 5-litre sports cars. Powered by a Type 912 flat-12 engine which was progressively enlarged from 4.5 to 5.0 litres, the 917 was introduced in 1969 and initially proved unwieldy on the race track but continuous development improved the handling and it went on to dominate sports-car racing in 1970 and 1971. In 1970 it gave Porsche its first overall win at the 24 Hours of Le Mans, a feat it would repeat in 1971. It would be chiefly responsible for Porsche winning the International Championship for Makes in 1970 and 1971. Porsche went on to develop the 917 for Can-Am racing, culminating in the twin-turbocharged 917/30 which was even more dominant in the role. Porsche drivers would win the Can-Am championship in 1972 and 1973. 917 drivers also won the Interserie championship every year from 1969 to 1975.

Origins of the 917

In an effort to reduce the speeds at Le Mans and other fast circuits of the unlimited capacity Group 6 prototypes (such as the seven-litre Ford GT40 Mk.IV and four-litre V12 Ferrari P) the Commission Sportive Internationale (then the independent competition arm of the FIA) announced that the International Championship of Makes would be run for three-litre Group 6 prototypes for four years from 1968 through 1971. This capacity reduction would also serve to entice manufacturers who were already building three-litre Formula One engines to adapt them for endurance racing.

Well aware that few manufacturers were ready to take up the challenge immediately, the CSI also allowed the participation of five-litre Group 4 sports cars, of which a minimum of 50 units had to be manufactured. This targeted existing cars like the ageing Ford GT40 Mk.I and the newer Lola T70 coupé.

In April 1968, facing few entrants in races, the CSI announced that the minimum production figure to compete in the sport category of the International Championship of Makes (later the World Sportscar Championship) was reduced from 50 to 25, starting in 1969 through the planned end of the rules in 1971. With Ferrari absent in 1968, mainly Porsche 908s and Ford P68s were entered there, with the Ford being a total failure. As a result, old 2.2-litre Porsche 907s often won that category, with John Wyer's 4.7-litre Ford GT40 Mk.I taking wins at faster tracks.

Starting in July 1968, Porsche made a surprising and expensive effort to take advantage of this rule. As they were rebuilding race cars with new chassis every race or two anyway, selling the used cars to customers, they decided to conceive, design and build 25 versions of a whole new car with 4.5-litre for the sport category with one underlying goal: to win its first overall victory in the 24 Hours of Le Mans on June 14, 1970. In only ten months the Porsche 917 was developed, based on the Porsche 908.

When Porsche was first visited by the CSI inspectors only three cars were completed, while 18 were being assembled and seven additional sets of parts were present. Porsche argued that if they assembled the cars they would then have to take them apart again to prepare the cars for racing. The inspectors refused the homologation and asked to see 25 assembled and working cars.

On March 12, 1969, a 917 was displayed at the Geneva Motor Show, painted white with a green nose and a black No. 917. Brief literature on the car detailed a cash price of DM 140,000, approximately £16,000 at period exchange rates, or the price of about ten Porsche 911s. This price did not cover the costs of development.

On April 20 Porsche's head of motorsports Ferdinand Piëch displayed 25 917s parked in front of the Porsche factory to the CSI inspectors. Piëch even offered the opportunity to drive any of the cars, which was declined.

Construction
The car's chassis was designed by Helmuth Bott and the engine was designed by Hans Mezger, both under the leadership of Ferdinand Piëch. The car was built around a very light spaceframe chassis which was permanently pressurised with gas to detect cracks in the welded structure.  Power came from a new 4.5-litre air-cooled engine designed by Mezger. Originally, a combination of two of Porsche's 2.25L flat-6 engines from previous racing cars were used as a proof of concept. Latter, a completely new flat 12 block was design without the cylinder offset needed on the individual flat 6 to keep the engine compact. The 'Type 912' engine featured a 180° flat-12 cylinder layout, twin overhead camshafts driven from centrally mounted gears and twin spark plugs fed from two distributors. The large horizontally mounted cooling fan was also driven from centrally mounted gears. The longitudinally mounted gearbox was designed to take a set of four or five gears.

To keep the car compact despite the large engine, the driving position was so far forward that the feet of the driver were beyond the front wheel axle. The car had remarkable technology. It was Porsche's first 12-cylinder engine and used many components made of titanium, magnesium and exotic alloys that had been developed for lightweight "Bergspider" hill climb racers. Other methods of weight reduction were rather simple, such as making the gear shift knob out of birch wood, some methods were not simple, such as using the tubular frame itself as oil piping to the front oil cooler.

There are at least eleven variants of the 917. The original version had a removable long tail/medium tail with active rear wing flaps, but had considerable handling problems at high speed because of significant rear lift. The handling problems were investigated at a joint test at the Österreichring by the factory engineers and their new race team partners JW Automotive. After exhaustive experimentation by both groups, a shorter, more upswept tail was found to give the car more aerodynamic stability at speed. The changes were quickly adopted into the 917K for Kurzheck, or "short-tail". 

In 1971, a variant of the 917K appeared with a less upswept tail and vertical fins, and featured the concave rear deck that had proved so effective on the 1970 version of the 917L. The fins kept the clean downforce-inducing air on the top of the tail and allowed the angle of the deck to be reduced, reducing the drag in direct proportion. The result was a more attractive looking car that maintained down force for less drag and higher top speed. 

By this time the original 4.5-litre engine, which had produced around 520 bhp in 1969, had been enlarged through 4.9-litres (600 bhp) to 5-litres and produced a maximum of 630 bhp. 
The 917K models were generally used for the shorter road courses such as Sebring, Brands Hatch, Monza and Spa-Francorchamps. The big prize for Porsche however, was Le Mans. For the French circuit's long, high speed straights, the factory developed special long tail bodywork that was designed for minimum drag and thus highest maximum speed. On the car's debut in 1969, the 917L proved to be nearly uncontrollable as there was so little down force. In fact, they generated aerodynamic lift at the highest speeds. For 1970, an improved version was raced by the factory and for 1971, after very significant development in the wind tunnel, the definitive 917L was raced by both factory and JW.

In 1969 Jo Siffert raced an open-top 917PA Spyder (normally aspirated) in the 1969 CanAm series.  There is also the "Pink Pig" aerodynamic research version (917/20), and the turbocharged 917/10 and 917/30 CanAm Spyders. Porsche 917s also raced in the European Interseries in various configurations.  In the 1973 Can-Am series, the turbocharged version Porsche 917/30 developed .

Variants
There were a number of versions of Porsche 917 made over the years; at least eleven different versions have existed.

1969 917: 

The original Porsche 917 was first run at the Le Mans Test in March 1969 and right from the start showed considerable handling problems due to aerodynamic lift. The original specification of the car included a detachable long-tail (Langheck), that was designed using experience from the previous 907 long-tail coupés for minimum aerodynamic drag, with suspension controlled moving flaps on the tail. At Le Mans the CSI baulked at this, moving aerodynamic aids having been banned in motorsport. It was only when Rolf Stommelen demonstrated how undriveable the car was without the moving flaps that they relented and allowed them for Le Mans only. Throughout 1969 the car's speed was countered by the handling problems and it won only one race, the Zeltweg 1000km. Following that event, JW Automotive, who would be acting as a semi-works team in 1970, requested a test session with Porsche to try and sort out the car's problems.

1969 917PA: 

The 917PA was an open-topped and short-tailed version of the original 917 and was built to compete in Can-Am racing. Only two cars were built by Porsche. The first never raced, and later became a test mule for an experimental flat-16 engine. The second car was entered in the 1969 Can-Am season by Porsche Audi, the North American distributors for Porsche (hence the PA designation), and driven by Jo Siffert. Compared to the dominant McLarens, the car was underpowered and overweight. Siffert's best result was 3rd at Bridgehampton, and he finished 4th in the championship. For 1971 the car was obtained by Vasek Polak who ran it for the next three years with the car gaining ever more aerodynamic aids, until by 1973 it resembled the 917/10 variant.

The design of the 917PA's gently upswept tail was one of the contributors to the search for better handling of the 917 coupés, resulting in the 917K variant.

1970 917K: 

The 917K was an evolution of the original 1969 car. After the first 917s were run in 1969, it was clear the car's aerodynamics made it nearly undriveable at higher speeds. After the 1969 championship season had finished, John Wyer requested a 3-day test session at the Austrian Österreichring course. The Porsche technical team turned out ready to do some serious panel work on the coupé and in order to make a comparison, brought along the Can-Am 917PA Spyder. The drivers present instantly preferred the PA and together, the JW Automotive and Porsche engineers came up with the idea of a more upswept tail (as on the 917PA). The JW team had had similar high speed handling problems with the early Ford GT40 models. With gaffer tape and aluminium sheet, a completely new short tail was evolved at the racetrack. This was quickly converted into a 'production' design back at Porsche and the 917K (Kurzheck) made its public debut at the season opening 1970 24 Hours of Daytona. Such was the improvement in the stability of the car at high speed, the 917K became the standard configuration for all races except Le Mans, the Nürburgring 1000km and the Targa Florio. This car was raced at every event by JW Automotive and Porsche Salzburg in the 1970 season except the Targa Florio and the Nürburgring 1000 km. The smaller, more nimble and generally better suited 908/03s were used for those races, but privateers used the 917K at the Nürburgring 1000 km, and Vic Elford drove a lap of the 44-mile Targa Florio course in the 917K at Ferdinand Piëch's request. The 917K won 7 out of 10 races; all the races it competed in. Later on in the 1970 season, the 4.5 litre flat-12 was bored out to 4.9 litres, then 5 litres.

1970 917L: 
This long tail, low drag version of the 1969 917L was purpose-built for the 1970 24 Hours of Le Mans. Le Mans in 1970 was almost entirely made up of long straights and this version was designed to maximise the speed capability resulting from the increased power developed by the flat-12 engine over the previous Porsche types. The 1970 917L was largely based on the initial 1969 car. Nevertheless, factory driver Vic Elford had found the car's ultimate speed an advantage enough over its still questionable handling in the braking and cornering sections of Le Mans. It was 25 mph faster down the straights than the 917K and the Ferrari 512Ss. Two were entered in the 1970 Le Mans race, one by Porsche Salzburg and the other by Martini Racing. The Porsche Salzburg 917L was qualified in pole position by Elford, but retired with engine failure after 18 hours and the Martini 917L finished 2nd, five laps behind the winning Salzburg 917K of Hans Herrmann and Richard Attwood.

1971 917 16 Cylinder: 

In an effort to keep up with other more powerful cars in the Can-Am championship, a 6.6 litre, 750PS (551kW, 739 bhp) flat-16 engined prototype was developed. It was tested in the original 917PA chassis, with the wheelbase extended by 270mm to take the longer engine. Although more powerful than the flat-12, it was also 80 kg heavier. Porsche decided that turbocharging the flat-12 would be more profitable, and the flat-16 was shelved.

1971 917K: 

The 917K was further developed for the 1971 season, and the car had vertical fins and two airboxes on the tail section for better aerodynamics and cooling. The fins retained the airflow over the rear part of the bodywork, allowing the deck height to be reduced for a given level of downforce. As a result, the 'finned' 1971 917Ks were faster than the 1970 versions and proved just as successful, winning seven of the eleven WSC races. A version of this model with a lightweight magnesium chassis won the 1971 24 Hours of Le Mans.

1971 917LH: 

The 1971 model was a further development of the 1970 917L and was also made specifically to compete in only one race: the 1971 24 Hours of Le Mans. The car was also more stable than its 1970 predecessor because of a revised suspension set up and new bodywork with partially enclosed rear wheel covers and a redesigned front section. Two were run by JW Automotive and one by the Martini International team. Although Jackie Oliver qualified one of the JW 917LHs on pole position, none of the three cars finished the race.

1971 917 Interserie Spyder: 
Three Porsche 917 Spyders were built for use in the German Interserie championship, rebuilt from 917s that had been crashed or otherwise written off. These cars were very successful, winning the 1971 Interserie championship.

1971 917/10: 

The 917/10 was built for Can-Am racing, with a 5 litre engine, new bodywork and weight pared to a minimum. It was run in the latter part of the 1971 Can-Am season by Jo Siffert, with moderately successful results.

1971 917/20: 

The 917/20 was a one-off experimental R&D car. It was made as an intermediate car to combine the low drag of the Langheck and the stability of the Kurz, and was also a test-bed for future Can-Am parts and aerodynamic low-drag concepts. It was only raced once, at the 1971 24 Hours of Le Mans where it was entered by the Martini International team and driven by Reinhold Joest and Willi Kauhsen. Known as the "Pink Pig" for its broad proportions, it was given a pink livery with names of meat cuts running over the bodywork. Although it qualified seventh and ran as high as third, it retired from the race after an accident caused by brake failure at Arnage while Joest was driving.

1972 917/10: 

The revised 917/10 was Porsche's first full-scale attempt at Can-Am for 1972. This car ran the 5.0 litre flat-12 and was modified to accommodate additional compression; two turbochargers were added to give the car tremendous horsepower. George Follmer won the championship in the Roger Penske car.

1973 917/30:

The 917/30, the final official iteration of the 917, is one of the most powerful sports racing cars to have ever existed. The car had all new bodywork, and the twin turbocharged engine was bored out to 5.4 litres giving it 1100–1580 horsepower, depending on the state of tune. These cars dominated Can-Am racing to such an extent that the series lost popularity in the United States. A total of six chassis were built.

Racing history

1969-1971 World Sportscar Championship

1969
In testing, it soon appeared that the Porsche 917 did not work well on the race track. Porsche factory driver Brian Redman recalled that "it was incredibly unstable, using all the road at speed." Many thought that the 4.5-litre engine was too much for the frame. The suspension and the stability of the frame were suspected, but modifications did not improve the problem. It was finally determined that the "long tail" body was generating significant lift on the straights, as the 917 was  faster than anything previously built for Le Mans . As with former under-powered Porsches, the 917 aerodynamics had been optimized for low drag in order to do well on the fast straights of Le Mans, Spa, Monza and elsewhere. The significance of downforce for racing was not yet fully realised although Can-Am and F1 cars were using wings by that time.

Before its competition debut on 11 May 1969 in the 1000km Spa, the weather conditions prevented further improvements in tests. The Jo Siffert/Brian Redman car managed to clock an unofficial lap time of 3:41.9 which would have beaten the pole of 3:42.5 set by a Lola, but they chose to use the 908LH long tail with which they won the race and set the fastest lap at 3:37.1. Gerhard Mitter/Udo Schütz actually started the race from 8th, but their already ailing engine failed after one lap.

Three weeks later for the 1000km Nürburgring, all works drivers preferred the 908 over the 917 which was, despite some modifications, not suited for the twisty track. As it was necessary to promote the car in order to sell the surplus ones, Porsche asked BMW for the services of their factory drivers Hubert Hahne and Dieter Quester. They practised, but Munich declined permission to have them race, so Englishman David Piper and Australian Frank Gardner were hired on short terms. They drove the 917 to an eighth-place finish behind a Ford and an Alfa, while the factory's armada of six 908/02 spyders scored a 1-2-3-4-5 win after the only serious competition, a sole Ferrari 312P, failed.

At the 1969 24 Hours of Le Mans, the 917s were quickest in practice. Soon after the start the poor handling of the 917 and the inexperience of one of the drivers resulted in drama: British gentleman-driver John Woolfe crashed his Porsche 917 at Maison Blanche on lap 1, dying as a result. Woolfe was the first privateer to race a 917. The works #14 917 led early, but succumbed to an oil leak, while the #12 dropped out of the lead and the race in the 21st hour with a broken gearbox, despite leading by nearly 50 miles. At the end, Hans Herrmann's 908 remained as the only Porsche that could challenge for the win, but Jacky Ickx's more powerful Ford won once again, by a mere .

In June 1969, Enzo Ferrari sold half of his stock to FIAT, and used some of that money to build 25 cars powered by a 5-litre V12 in order to compete with the Porsche 917: the Ferrari 512 would be introduced for the 1970 season.

At that time, the 917 already had several races under its belt, yet no success. The first win came in the last race of the championship season, the 1000 km Zeltweg. Jo Siffert and Kurt Ahrens succeeded in the privately entered Porsche 917 of German Freiherr von Wendt. At that time, the factory had started to focus on development, leaving the time-consuming trips to races to customer teams.

1970

Disappointed by the poor results of the 917 in 1969, and facing new competition, Porsche concluded an agreement with John Wyer and his JWA Gulf Team, which became the official Porsche team, and also the official development partner. During tests at the Österreichring at Zeltweg, works drivers Redman and Ahrens tested the car, and the car still performed like it did before. The Österreichring was the circuit where the car had won its only race at that time, Wyer's chief engineer John Horsman noticed that the bodywork had a pattern of dead gnats dashed against it, revealing the airflow. The tail was clean—the lack of dead gnats indicated that the air was not flowing over the tail. A modification to the tail was cobbled-up on the spot in the pits with aluminium sheets taped together. This new short tail gave the 917 much needed downforce. The plastic engine intake cover had already been removed. Redman and Ahrens were doing only one lap at a time before, they each did 10 laps and were satisfied with the improved performance. The new version was called 917K (or "short tail").

In addition to the heavier and powerful 917, the lightweight and compact Porsche 908/3 were developed for the slow and twisty tracks of the Nürburgring and the Sicilian mountain roads used in the Targa Florio, providing wins while the factory-backed 917 remained in the garages, as these cars were not suitable for these tracks. The 908/3 was built to the FIA's 3-litre Group 6 Prototype regulations whereas the 917 was now officially a Group 5 Sports Car following another FIA review of its racing classes, applicable from 1970.

Wyer was surprised to discover that another team was carefully preparing for the 1970 24 Hours of Le Mans with close support from Porsche. As in 1969, the Porsche Salzburg team was a de facto works team under control of members of the Porsche family. The Martini Racing team also gained support from Porsche AG; obviously Porsche made efforts to win the race by supporting more than one team.

Also, a new low drag version of the 917 was developed for Le Mans with support from the external consultant Robert Choulet. The 917LH (Langheck) featured a spectacular new long tail body which had very low drag, yet more rear downforce than the 1969 long tail. A 4.9-litre engine, introduced at 1000km Monza, was available but these proved to be unreliable for longer distance races.

The 917 did not compete at all the races of the season, however. Porsche's previous competition model, the 908, was redesigned with an all-new chassis and designated 908/03 so it would be used at the Targa Florio and Nurburgring 1000 km events- two twisty, narrow and slow tracks the 917 was not competitive at. Vic Elford drove a 917 during practice for the 1970 Targa Florio and it proved to be so physically demanding and difficult to drive around the circuit that he had to be lifted out of the car, although he set the 5th fastest time. The 908/03 was very effective at these two races. Porsche's dedication was such that they were building cars for each type of track- the 908/03 for the slow, twisty tracks, the 917K for the medium and high-speed tracks, and the 917L for the fast straights of Le Mans.

The favourite team to win, Gulf-backed JW Automotive, lined up three 917Ks, two with the 4.9-litre engine and one with the 4.5-litre unit.

Two 917 LH were entered in Le Mans, one in white and red trim by Porsche Salzburg. Driven by Vic Elford and Kurt Ahrens, the pole sitter's 4.9-litre engine dropped an inlet valve after 225 laps. Both drivers had also been entered on the team's other car, a red and white 917 K with the 4.5-litre engine, qualified by Hans Herrmann and Richard Attwood in rather low 15th spot, but they did not drive after their own car failed.

The other LH was entered by Martini Racing, qualified by Willi Kauhsen and Gérard Larrousse on 12th position. The spectacular livery of this car was elaborate whirls and swoops of light green on a dark blue background. The car with the 4.5L engine gained the nickname of the Hippie Car or the Psychedelic Porsche from the team and media.

Early in the race, most of the works Ferrari 512 entrants eliminated each other in a shunt. The two Porsche factory teams, Gulf-Wyer and Porsche Salzburg, continued to battle each other, but all Wyer cars were out after 12 hours. At the end it was the red and white #23 917K of Porsche Salzburg, with the standard 4.5-litre engine, carefully driven by Stuttgart's own Hans Herrmann and Englishman Richard Attwood through the pouring rain, that finally scored the first overall win at Le Mans, in a wet race that saw only 7 ranked finishers. Martini's 917LH came in 2nd. Both cars were later paraded across Stuttgart. In addition to Porsche's triumphant 1, 2 victory, a Porsche 908 came in third overall, a Porsche 914-6 came in sixth overall (plus it won the GT class), and a Porsche 911S was seventh.  (Two Ferrari 512s took fourth and fifth place overall.)

Towards the end of the 1970 season, Ferrari entered some races with a new version of the 512, the 512M (Modificata). The 512M had a new bodywork built on a similar aerodynamic doctrine as the Porsche 917K. At the end of 1970 the 512M was as fast as the 917s, but still lacked in reliability.

During the 1970 season the FIA announced that Group 5 Sports Cars would be limited to a 3-litre engine capacity maximum for the newly renamed World Championship of Makes in 1972, so the big 917s and 512s would have to retire from the championship at the end 1971. Surprisingly, Ferrari decided to give up any official effort with the 512 in order to prepare for the 1972 season. A new prototype, the 312 PB, was presented and entered by the factory in several races. But many 512s were still raced by private teams, most of them converted to M specification.

By the end of 1970, Porsche had stamped their authority on endurance racing by convincingly dominating the championship that year. Of the 10 races in the championship (plus some other non-championship events), the works teams (JW Automotive and Porsche Salzburg) had won every race except Sebring (which was won by Ferrari) that year with the two models of cars they used, the 917K and the 908/03; with the 917K winning 7 of 8 events it was entered in; and the 908/03 winning at the Targa Florio and the Nürburgring (the 917K was not entered by the works teams at these two events). Still having some of their 25 cars remaining unsold, Ferrari offered them to customers at a bargain price – a move that had hardly been imaginable less than two years previously.  For Porsche, the original production series of 25 917s could not satisfy demand.  Over 50 chassis were built in total.  An underdog for 20 years, Porsche had turned itself into the new leader of sports car racing with the 917.

1971

The season began with the JW Automotive team scoring a 1-2 finish at the Buenos Aires 1000km, Jo Siffert and Derek Bell leading Pedro Rodriguez and Jackie Oliver home. At the 24 Hours of Daytona, much was expected of the Roger Penske Ferrari 512M which qualified on pole, almost 1.3 seconds ahead of the fastest 917. However, mechanical problems plagued the Ferrari and it finished third, 14 laps behind winners Rodriguez and Oliver. At the 12 Hours of Sebring it was the turn of the Martini Racing team to triumph, Vic Elford and Gerard Larrousse taking the honours.

The first upset came at the Brands Hatch 1000km. Ferrari and Alfa Romeo had turned their attention to developing cars for the forthcoming 3-litre regulations and the 312 PB and Tipo 33-3 were proving as fast as the 917s. At Brands Hatch, a large grid on the twisting, damp track suited the Italian cars and Porsche finished third behind the Alfa Romeo of Andrea de Adamich and Henri Pescarolo and the Ferrari of Jackie Ickx and Clay Regazzoni. The high-speed circuits at the Monza 1000km and Spa 1000km played to the 917's strengths and the JW-Gulf cars finished 1-2 in both races, Pedro Rodriguez and Jackie Oliver being the winners in both events.

Throughout the season Porsche continued to develop the 917, introducing new versions of the short and long-tailed bodywork, and trying out a magnesium chassis, with which they would win the 1971 24 Hours of Le Mans. The most interesting development was the 917/20, built as test-bed for future Can-Am parts and aerodynamic "low-drag" concepts. The 917/20 had done well in the early-season Le Mans Test and, following uncomplimentary remarks about its size and shape, was painted in pink for the 24 hour race itself, with names of cuts of meat written in German across it in a similar fashion to a butcher's carcass diagram. This earned it the nickname "Der Trüffeljäger von Zuffenhausen" (The Trufflehunter of Zuffenhausen, or just plain "Pink Pig". It qualified 7th and ran as high as 3rd, but during the night Reinhold Joest, co-driving with Willi Kauhsen, crashed the car at Arnage after its brakes failed.

Also at Le Mans the revised Langhecks, now cured of their earlier vices, all failed to finish, although Pedro Rodriguez set a fastest qualifying lap which, partly due to circuit changes, still stands today. The winning car was the Martini Racing 917K of Helmut Marko and Gijs van Lennep, equipped with a magnesium frame, which set an overall distance record that stood until 2010. All in all, four separate Le Mans track records were broken that year: fastest qualifying lap, fastest in-race lap, highest top speed, and longest distance covered, all set by 917s.

The Targa Florio and Nurburgring 1000km were again missed out by the works teams, although privateer Willi Kauhsen, partnered by Reinhold Joest took 5th place at the Nurburgring. The next race was another high-speed circuit, the Österreichring, where Pedro Rodriguez and Richard Attwood brought the only 917 finisher home in 1st place. The last race of the season, and the last race under the 5-litre capacity regulations, was the Watkins Glen 6 Hours. The Penske Ferrari again beat the 917 to the pole, but again suffered mechanical problems and failed to finish. However, the Alfa Romeo Tipo 33 of Andrea de Adamich and Ronnie Peterson beat the JW Porsches to the flag by a margin of two laps. And with that, the 917's World Sportscar career was over. JW Automotive took a car to the non-championship Barcelona 1000km and the 1000 km of Paris, Derek Bell and Gijs van Lennep winning the latter event.

The 917's swansong came in 1972, when Wilson Fittipaldi won the last race in the Copa Brasil series in the ex-Zitro Racing 917K.

1972–1973 Can-Am

As the new rules for the 3-litre prototypes were not favourable to their existing low-weight, low-power Porsche 908, Porsche decided against developing a new high power engine that could keep up with the F1-based engine designs of the competition — at least in naturally aspirated form. In 1976 they would return to sport-prototype racing with the turbocharged Porsche 936 race cars after the engines were tested in Porsche 911 versions.

After their successes with the 917 mainly in Europe, Porsche instead decided to focus on the North American markets and the Can-Am Challenge. For that series, larger and more powerful engines were needed. The 917 chassis also had to be lengthened to accept the longer 16-cylinder engine, and drivers complained that this longer chassis did not handle as well.

The turbocharged  917/10K entered by Penske Racing won the 1972 series with George Follmer, after a testing accident sidelined primary driver Mark Donohue. This broke the five-year stranglehold McLaren had on the series. Charlie Kemp won the Mosport race, George Follmer won Road Atlanta and Mark Donohue won the rest. Most of the opposition was made of private 917/10K as McLaren, unable to compete against the 917 turbos, had already left the series to concentrate on Formula 1 and the Indy 500.

The 917's domination, the oil crisis, and fiery tragedies like Roger Williamson's in Zandvoort pushed the SCCA to introduce a 3 miles per U.S. gallon maximum fuel consumption rule for 1974. Due to this change, the Penske 917/30 competed in only one race in 1974, and some customers retrofitted their 917/10K with naturally aspirated engines.

The 917/30 was the most powerful sports car racer ever built and raced. The 917/30 dominated the Can-Am series during the 1973 season. The 917 was also the only championship winning car in Can Am not to be powered by Chevrolet.

1981
In 1981, it appeared that new Le Mans regulations would allow a 917 to race again.
The Kremer Racing team entered a home-built updated 917, the 917 K-81.

The car raced at Le Mans qualifying in the top 10 but retired after seven hours after a collision with a back marker led to a loss of oil and withdrawal.

The final chapter though was to be at Brands Hatch where the car ran in the 6 hours at the end of the season. The car was competitive and ran at or near the front, including a spell in the lead until a suspension failure led to retirement.

World Sportscar Championship victories

Individual production and race history
In 1969–71 production consisted of 43 naturally aspirated cars (36 K, 5 LH and 2 Spyders) and 16 turbocharged (13 917/10 and 3 917/30), for a total of 59 917s built. The table below summaries the racing history of each chassis. Multiple winners have each win listed, but otherwise only the best result for each chassis is mentioned.

Other uses
On 9 August 1975, Porsche and Penske would give the Can-Am car its final send off in style, when they took their 917/30 to Talladega to break the FIA speed record on a closed circuit. As well as being the last official outing for the 917, it was the last major accomplishment for Donohue before his fatal accident in practice for the Austrian Grand Prix a week later. The record would stand until 1980.

Several 917 coupés as well as 917/10s (powered by turbos or NA engines) were run in Europe's Interserie until the mid-1970s.

Many 917 leftover parts, especially chassis, suspension and brake components, would be used to build the Porsche 936 in 1976.

Despite the car's impracticality, at least three 917s were road-registered:

Count Gregorio Rossi di Montelera of the Martini company, bought chassis 030 from Porsche. He raced it once under the Martini Racing Team Flag at the Zeltweg 1000 km World Championship race on 27 June 1971. After the race, it was returned to the factory, where it was modified with basic road equipment (exterior mirrors, turn signals, exhaust system and comfort modifications) and painted silver. None of the European authorities would certify the car for road use and Rossi obtained the Alabama plate 61-27737 to circumvent the problems.

The second, for Joachim Grossmann, was painted white and given the German registration CW-K 917. The Danish car magazine Bilen in a 1977 article details how Grossmann bought the frame and other components in 1975 for 20,000 DM, rebuilt it and then modified it (examples: turn signals, hand brake, Safety glass windows and some modifications to the exhaust system) to satisfy German safety inspectors leading to the registration.

Claudio Roddaro was able to register another original 917 that was modified for the road, in Monaco in 2016. Chassis number 037 was accepted based upon the precedent of Count Rossi's road registered example.

Several high end replicas that use the flat-6 from the 911 have been also be made. One is built in Australia by Kraftwerkz, another in the US by Race-Car Replicas.

In addition, a grass roots "replica," the Laser 917, which is essentially a rebodied VW Beetle, was featured in the film Herbie Goes to Monte Carlo.

The Gulf Oil liveried 917 Kurzhecks' are also prominently featured in the Steve McQueen film Le Mans competing against Ferrari's 512 Coda Lunga.

Aurora slot cars released some of these Porsche 917s in their AFX line-up, replicated to their original colours and markings. They were widely available in the early to mid-70s and were raced completely stock.

A replica of a 917/10  was used in the 1981 film 'The Last Chase'.

References
Notes

Bibliography

Further reading
1972 – The Making of a Winner: The Porsche 917 by Larry Pihera
1976 – The Fabulous Porsche 917 (1st edition) by Peter Hinsdale
1986 – Porsche 917 (Super Profile) by John Allen
1987 – Porsche 917: The Ultimate Weapon by Ian Bamsey
1987 – Porsche 917 (Kimberleys Racing Sportscar Guide) Guide by Michael Cotton
1999 – Porsche 917, the Winning Formula by Peter Morgan
2000 – Porsche 917, Unique Motor Books
2006 – Porsche 917, The Undercover Story by Gordon Wingrove
2008 – Porsche 917: Esquisses d'un succès by Reynald Hezard 
2008 – Porsche 917: The Heroes, The Victories, The Myth by Thomas Födisch, Jost Neßhöver, Rainer Roßbach, Harold Schwarz
2009 – Porsche 917: The Complete Photographic History by Glen Smale
2014 – Porsche 917: Archive and Works Catalogue by Walter Näher
2015 – Porsche 917: Owners' Workshop Manual ,1969 onwards (all models) by Ian Wagstaff
2015 – Porsche 917 – the autobiography of 917-023 by Ian Wagstaff
2018 – Gulf 917'' by Jay Gillotti, Published by Dalton Watson Fine Books

External links

 1970 Porsche Kurzheck Coupe (Official Porsche Website)
 1971 Porsche Kurzheck Coupe (Official Porsche Website)
 1973 Porsche 917/30 Spyder (Official Porsche Website)
 Video of Porsche 917
 FIA Historic Racing Regulations
 Historic Appendix J Regulations

Sports prototypes
Can-Am cars
24 Hours of Le Mans race cars
Le Mans winning cars
917
Group 4 (racing) cars